Textual Practice is a bimonthly peer-reviewed academic journal covering radical literary studies. The editor-in-chief is Peter Boxall (University of Sussex). It was established in 1987 by Methuen and is currently published by Routledge, who absorbed Methuen's academic publishing operations.

Abstracting and indexing 
The journal is abstracted and indexed in the Arts and Humanities Citation Index and the MLA International Bibliography.

External links 
 

Taylor & Francis academic journals
Publications established in 1987
English-language journals
Literary magazines published in the United Kingdom
Bimonthly journals